La Gazette du Maroc was a francophone weekly publication based in Casablanca, Morocco. It was published in newspaper format in the period March 1997–May 2008. It was restarted as a weekly magazine and published in this format between August 2008 and 2009.

History
La Gazette du Maroc was established by Kamal Lahlou in 1997. The first issue appeared in March 1997. The paper was published by Les Editions de La Gazette on a weekly basis in Casablanca. It featured news at the levels of local, national and international. In July 2003 the paper started an Arabic supplement. 

The last issue of La Gazette du Maroc in newspaper format was published on 15 May 2008, and it was restarted as a weekly magazine in August the same year. However, it permanently folded in 2009.

See also
 List of newspapers in Morocco

References

External links

1997 establishments in Morocco
2009 disestablishments in Morocco
Defunct magazines published in Morocco
Defunct newspapers published in Morocco
Defunct weekly newspapers
French-language magazines
French-language newspapers published in Morocco
Magazines established in 2008
Magazines disestablished in 2009
Mass media in Casablanca
Newspapers established in 1997
Publications disestablished in 2008
Weekly news magazines
News magazines published in Africa